The Nissan Xterra is a truck-based compact SUV manufactured and marketed by Nissan from 1999–2015 across two generations; the first (1999–2004) sharing a platform as well as front bumper, hood, A-pillar, windshield and front doors with the Nissan Frontier pickup – and the second (2005–2015) also sharing its platform with the Frontier and Pathfinder.

While the two Xterra generations differed significantly, both prioritized ruggedness and affordability over luxury and used body-on-frame construction along with underbody skid plates. Both generations also used a two-box design with C-pillar-mounted rear door handles, asymmetrical rear window, tailgate bump-out for a first aid kit accessible from inside – and a prominent two-tiered roof enabling stadium seating in the second row. The stepped roof accommodated a lower, front roof rack with a removable gear basket and a more conventional roof rack at the rear, upper roof.

Nissan licensed the Xterra name from the XTERRA off-road triathlon race series and manufactured the SUV at Nissan's Smyrna Assembly, as well as in Canton, Mississippi.  Variants were also manufactured in Brazil and China.

Styled by NDI Director of Design Tom Semple and developed at Nissan Design America in La Jolla, California, the Xterra was the first Nissan vehicle completely conceived, developed and manufactured in the United States. According to Jerry Hirshberg, president of Nissan Design International (NDI), "the impetus for Xterra designers was to create an affordable, rugged, quality piece of equipment". He later described it as "a garage tool that says, 'treat me rough' – it's designed to look better dirty than clean."

Road & Track described the Xterra as "an honest SUV that doesn't try to be a luxury car alternative, nor tries to hide its truck underpinnings". Jalopnik called it a "knockoff of the Land Rover Discovery". The Washington Post described it as "rugged without bravado". The second generation Nissan Xterra is a part of the Santa Fe Police and Dubai Police's fleet of patrol cars.



First generation (WD22; 1999) 

The Xterra was introduced in North America in the 2000 model year. In that market, two trim levels were offered during the Xterra's first two years, marketed as XE and SE.

The XE featured a  KA24DE I4, 5-speed manual transmission, and steel wheels as well as several option packages combining the 170 horsepower 3.3 L VG33E V6 engine with either a 5-speed manual or 4-speed automatic transmission, as well as roof rack (rated for a load up to 125lbs), side step-rails, and sunroof. The SE featured standard equipment that was optional on an XE. All models featured removable, tab-secured rear seat cushions to accommodate a fold-flat rear seat back. Canadian models from 1999 to 2004 were limited to the VG33E V6 engine with part-time 4WD.

2002 update 

With the 1999 Xterra having been developed at Nissan Design America in California, all updates for the 2002 Xterra were executed at Nissan Technical Center-North America in Farmington Hills, Michigan.  The facelifted model debuted at the 2001 Chicago Auto Show prominently revised front-end styling with rounded headlights, revised instrument panel, center console, larger glove compartment, pullout rear cup holders and four interior power points, foot-operated pedal parking brake (vs. previous a dash-mounted pull-and-twist parking brake) — and an increase of 10 horsepower for the V6 engine.

The rear differential for all Xterras and Frontiers are H233B with a number of gear ratios offered in both limited slip and open configurations. The most common being 4.636:1 and 4.9:1. Early differentials has a flange style input to the pinion while late 2004 through the end of production had a Spicer yoke style input to the pinion.

For 2003 the front seats received additional adjustability with added lumbar support and in SE models the available 6-disc, 4-speaker AM/FM/CD audio system was replaced by a 6-speaker 300W Rockford Fosgate AM/FM/CD audio system with an 8-inch subwoofer that took up a small portion of the rear storage area. The last of the model year 2004 Xterras were manufactured in January 2005.

Second generation (N50; 2005) 

The second generation Xterra debuted at the New York International Auto Show in 2004 using Nissan's F-Alpha platform. Larger in all dimensions than its predecessor, it entered showrooms in early 2005 for the 2005 model year. The standard engine was upgraded to Nissan's 4.0 L VQ40DE variable valve timing V6, producing . Early US models include X, S, SE and PRO-4X, with a choice of 6-speed manual or 5-speed automatic transmissions, a choice of part-time 4-wheel drive or 2-wheel drive. The M226 rear axle with a Dana 44 differential was standard on all manual transmission equipped models as well as all PRO-4X and off-road models. The PRO-4X and off-road also came standard with an electronic rear locking differential and either hill descent/start control or clutch interlock bypass switch on automatic and manual examples respectively.

2009 update

The Xterra received a facelift for 2009 (July 2008 production) with more options and colors, leather seats on SE models, new grille and front bumper, silver painted rear bumper and roof rack, and roof mounted lights on off-road models. The last year of the Nissan Xterra in Mexico was 2008. In 2012, production was moved from Smyrna, Tennessee, to Nissan's facility in Canton, Mississippi.

Other changes include:

 New HVAC controls and standard audio system.
 Available Bluetooth Hands-free Phone System, steering wheel audio controls and sunglass holder (overhead console) on all grade levels, except X model.
 Removed plastic engine cover.

Other updates
Changed name of off-road model to PRO-4X. (2011)
An updated NissanConnect with 4.3 or 5.8 inch screen and smartphone integration for iPhone and Android, allowing the user to connect with Pandora, iHeartRadio, Facebook and more. Capabilities include SiriusXM (subscription required, sold separately), streaming audio via Bluetooth, Hands-free Text Messaging Assistant and audio voice recognition. (2013)
New 16-inch aluminum-alloy wheel designs for the S and PRO-4X. (2014)
Heated front seats available on PRO-4X. (2014)
Available rear backup camera. (2014)

Discontinuation
The Xterra was discontinued in the U.S. after the 2015 model year.  Poor fuel economy, declining sales, and mandated upgrades to safety and emissions were cited as reasons.

Awards and recognition 
 2000 Motor Trends Sport Utility of the Year 
 2000 North American Truck of the Year
 2000 New England Motor Press Association's Winter Vehicle Award of New England for Best in Class – Mini Sport Utility
 2001 Named Top Car by AAA New Car and Truck Buying Guide
 2005 Named on the Automobile Magazines 50 Great New Cars list
 2006 Nominated as North American Truck of the Year
 2006 Motor Trends Sport Utility of the Year
 2006 Motor Trends Truck Trend's Best Little-Guy SUV Award
 2006 Car and Driver Rock-Hopper SUV Winner.
 2006 4×4 of the Year award from Petersen's 4-Wheel and Off-Road magazine.
 2006 Edmunds.com Editor's Most Wanted Vehicle
 2009 4Wheeler Magazines SUV of the Year
 2010 U.S. National Highway Traffic Safety Administration's highest Side-impact Safety Rating (five stars)

Production outside North America

All Nissan-produced Xterras manufactured outside the U.S. were built in São José dos Pinhais, Brazil until 2007. (Nissan ceased Brazilian production entirely in 2007.) It is built under license by Pars Khodro in Iran as the Nissan Roniz, and in China by Zhengzhou Nissan Automobile as the Nissan Paladin from 2003 to 2013. The Paladin uses the same chassis and running gear as the first generation Nissan Xterra, and the 2.4L KA24DE engine mated to a 5-speed manual transmission. The front end is from the local Pickup. (The second generation Xterra model is only available in North America.) Other difference between the American Xterra and its Chinese counterparts is the parking brake actuator, a pedal with a pull-handle release in America, and a lever in China.

Dongfeng Oting
Dongfeng Motors produces a Chinese version of the Xterra called the Oting from 2007 to 2015. It is based on the first generation of the Xterra. It was available with the 2.4-liter 4G64 and 4G69 or a 2.5-liter turbo-diesel engine paired to a 5-speed manual gearbox.

In comparison to pricing, the Chinese market Nissan Paladin was priced at 159,800 to 244,800 RMB (25,264 to US$38,702) while the Oting was priced at 119,800 to 154,800 RMB (18,940 to US$24,473). Trim levels for the Paladin were called the 2WD S, 2WD C, 2WD L, 2WD E, 4WD S, 4WD C, 4WD L and 4WD E. Trim levels for the Oting were called the China III MT L, China III MT E, China III AT L, China IV MT L, China IV MT E, Diesel 2WD and the Diesel 4WD.

Successor
Following the Xterra's discontinuation from the U.S. market in 2015, Nissan began testing the D23 Navara-based SUV. The SUV, later named Terra, made its debut in Asia in early 2018, and the updated version was released in the Middle East in late 2020 under the "X-Terra" name.

Sales

References

External links

Nissan USA  – Official American site
Official site on Nissan China
A story of Nissan Paladin and the Chinese team in a 2005 long-distance auto race (Dakar 2005) from this website: Nissan Motorsports website

Xterra
Compact sport utility vehicles
Mid-size sport utility vehicles
Rear-wheel-drive vehicles
All-wheel-drive vehicles
2000s cars
2010s cars
Cars introduced in 1999
Motor vehicles manufactured in the United States
Vehicles discontinued in 2016